The Chinese Woman may refer to:

The Chinese Woman, painting by Vladimir Tretchikoff
Chinese Girl, painting by Tretchikoff
La Chinoise, film by Jean-Luc Godard
The Chinese Woman (Seinfeld)